Trechus amharicus is a species of ground beetle in the subfamily Trechinae. It was described by Ortuño & Novoa in 2011.

References

amharicus
Beetles described in 2011